Junior Enterprise USA is the association of Junior Enterprises in the United States. The international federations of Junior Enterprises in Europe and Brazil are well recognized internationally by the European Commission and Brazilian government as beneficial student organizations which provide experiential learning opportunities and foster a strong entrepreneurial spirit among junior entrepreneurs. However, the United States movement did not start to show a strong presence in the worldwide movement until the creation of JE USA. The first Junior Enterprise, CUBE Consulting, was founded in the United States in 2012 at the University of Illinois Urbana-Champaign and was followed by the establishment of other two during the period of 2012-2015. Only in 2016, along with the creation of Lumnus Consulting at UC San Diego, the unification of current student-run companies in the USA through the JE USA association was envisioned. By finding founders across the nation and spreading the JE concept, Junior Enterprise USA showed exceptional growth and successful creation of development programs that would support initiatives in its first months of operation. The number of Junior Enterprises and Junior Initiatives in the USA is now increasing exponentially, with chapters at UC Berkeley, Columbia University, UC San Diego, University of Pennsylvania, New York University, University of Illinois Urbana-Champaign, and others.

CUBE Consulting
Champaign Urbana Business and Engineering Consulting is the 1st Junior Enterprise in the United States. It was founded in 2012 at the University of Illinois Urbana-Champaign through a partnership with iFoundry and Engineering Initiatives, both programs through the College of Engineering. Retired Illinois engineering professor Dave Goldberg spoke at the international Junior Entrepreneur World Conference in Brazil during the summer of 2011 and shared the Junior Enterprise with iFoundry, an engineering education incubator, and several of its students. Dave Goldberg would later feature CUBE Consulting in his book A Whole New Engineer as a revolutionary method of experiential engineering education. Using the support of iFoundry and the student-led Engineering Initiatives club, Illinois engineering students Karen Lamb, Stephanie Chou and Stephanie Nemec founded the first US Junior Enterprise in 2012 which would become CUBE Consulting.

Today, the organization is exclusively student-run with numerous projects every semester working with local businesses, while supporting the growing Junior Enterprise movement in the United States as the National federation continues to grow. CUBE Consulting now has over 100 alumni working across the United States and around the world.

Lumnus Consulting
Lumnus Consulting was founded in 2016 and based UC San Diego. As of 2018, Lumnus has a team of 40 members and a dozen completed projects. With strategic partners such as Johnson & Johnson's JLabs, Evonexus, and Avasant Management consulting, Lumnus works primarily with startups in the greater San Diego area.

References

Student organizations in the United States